Chittick is a surname. Notable people with the surname include:

Elizabeth Chittick (1908–2009), American feminist who served as president of the National Woman's Party
Fred Chittick (1868–1917), a Canadian ice hockey goaltender for the Ottawa Hockey Club from 1894 until 1901
Neville Chittick (1924–1984), British scholar and archaeologist
William Chittick (born 1943), leading translator and interpreter of classical Islamic philosophical and mystical texts
Yardley Chittick (1900–2008), for several years the oldest living patent attorney in the United States

See also
Nate Hobgood-Chittick (born 1974), American football player